Kvissel is a small village and railway town in Vendsyssel, Denmark. It is located in the Frederikshavn Municipality, about 10 km northwest of Frederikshavn, in Region Nordjylland. Its population is 363 (1 January 2022).

Kvissel is served by Kvissel railway station, located on the Vendsyssel railway line. This railway line would become the major growth factor for Kvissel. When the station on the line was built in 1877, it brought economic growth to the village.

See also
Kvissel murder

References 

Cities and towns in the North Jutland Region
Frederikshavn Municipality
Villages in Denmark